The Tri-City News is a weekly community newspaper based in Port Coquitlam and published by Glacier Media, and serving the Tri-Cities region of British Columbia's Lower Mainland since 1985. The Tri-City News has more than 100,000 print readers per issue, with its sister website, TriCityNews.com, logging more than 1,000,000 visits per month.

In the 2008 Better Newspapers Competition from the Canadian Community Newspapers Association, the Tri-City News took second place in "Best All-Round Newspaper" for large circulation newspapers, and won the "Best Front Page" category.

In 2015, Black Press sold the News to Glacier Media.

See also
List of newspapers in Canada

References

Further reading
Tri-City News To Resume Publishing Two Days Week

External links
Official website

Black Press
Newspapers published in British Columbia
Port Coquitlam
Publications established in 1985
1985 establishments in British Columbia
Biweekly newspapers published in Canada